Gluta laxiflora is a tree of Borneo in the cashew and sumac family Anacardiaceae. The specific epithet  is from the Latin meaning "loose flowers", referring to the arrangement of the flowers.

Description
Its dark grey bark is scaly.

Distribution and habitat
Gluta laxiflora is endemic to Borneo. Its habitat is lowland mixed dipterocarp forests.

References

laxiflora
Endemic flora of Borneo
Trees of Borneo
Plants described in 1933